Monochamus alternatus, the Japanese pine sawyer, is a species of beetle in the family Cerambycidae. It was described by Frederick William Hope in 1842. It is known from Hong Kong, Vietnam, Laos, North Korea, South Korea, Japan, China, and Taiwan. It feeds on Pinus banksiana, Abies firma, Pinus armandii, Pinus massoniana, and Pinus densiflora. It serves as a vector for the nematode Bursaphelenchus xylophilus.

Subspecies
 Monochamus alternatus alternatus 
 Monochamus alternatus endai

References

alternatus
Beetles described in 1842